Óscar Sacramento de Sousa (born September 8, 1951) has served as defense minister of São Tomé and Príncipe since December 2018. He previously served as defense minister from 2003 to 2008 and 2012 to 2014. He also served as acting foreign minister for two weeks in March 2004, and again from January 2006 to April 2006.

References

1951 births
Living people
Foreign Ministers of São Tomé and Príncipe
Government ministers of São Tomé and Príncipe
Defence Ministers of São Tomé and Príncipe
21st-century São Tomé and Príncipe politicians